North Esk may refer to:

North Esk River, Tasmania, Australia
Electoral district of North Esk, Tasmania, Australia
Electoral division of North Esk, Tasmania, Australia
Northesk Parish, New Brunswick, Canada, sometimes misspelt North Esk
River North Esk, Angus and Aberdeenshire, Scotland
 North Esk (Lothian), a tributary of the River Esk, Lothian, Midlothian and East Lothian, Scotland

See also
River Esk (disambiguation)
Earl of Northesk